In science, attrition are ratios regarding the loss of participants during an experiment. Attrition rates are values that indicate the participant drop out. Higher attrition rates are found in longitudinal studies.

See also 
 Intention-to-treat analysis
 Selection bias#Attrition

Further reading 
 
 

Experiments